Mojohan is one of the 51 union councils of Abbottabad District in Khyber-Pakhtunkhwa province of Pakistan. It is located in the west of the district.

References

Union councils of Abbottabad District

fr:Mojohan